Block Island School is a K-12 school in Block Island, Rhode Island. It was built in 1933, replacing five one roomed schools. Today, the Block Island School educates about 160 students, kindergarten through senior year. A regular school day, Monday through Thursday, runs from 7:50 am – 2:50 pm. Every Friday, school dismisses at 12:22 pm to allow for student-athletes to travel for sporting events either on, or off the island.

Athletics
The Block Island Hurricanes compete in three main sports, each played during different seasons.

Soccer
In the fall, the BI Hurricanes have both a junior high soccer team which consists of 6th, 7th, and 8th graders, and a varsity soccer team which consists of high school students. Both soccer teams are co-ed because of the limited numbers throughout the school. In 2014, the Block Island Hurricanes finished as the first seed in the Coastal Prep League and went on to win the 2014 CPL Championship against Oxford Academy. They followed up a dominating season with another good run at the championship, but fell short in a 3-1 upset by Blackstone Valley Prep.

Basketball
During the winter, the Block Island School students play basketball. There is a Junior High Girls, a Junior High Boys, a Varsity Girls, and a Varsity Boys basketball team. Each of the three teams experienced some extent of success throughout the 2014-2015 season. The junior high teams showed promising talent that will later help the varsity teams in future years. The varsity girls produced one of their most impressive seasons in recent school history. This included senior Kiley Hall being named a 2014-2015 Rhode Island Interscholastic Basketball League All-Star for Division III basketball. During this same year, she also became the third player in school history to achieve 1,000 career high school points joining Ross Draper and Derek Marsella. As for the Block Island Varsity Boys basketball team, they achieved total success in their season. They experienced an undefeated season (in league) and went on to win the 2014-2015 coastal prep league championship for boys basketball. With only seven players on the roster, every one of them influenced each game. This is the only time in school history that the Hurricanes have won the championship in two different sports during one year. The 2015-2016 boys basketball season was highlighted by gritty play from the young six man roster who finished with a surprising 8-8 league record. Richard Conant also became Block Islands fourth 1,000 point scorer.

Baseball
The BIS students also compete in baseball and softball in the spring. There are junior high and varsity teams for both baseball and softball. Male, spring athletes take part in baseball events while female athletes compete versus other softball teams. The varsity softball team worked well during the 2015 season winning more than half of their games. During the 2015 season, the boys varsity baseball team showed dominance. They only lost one league game and went on to win the coastal prep league championship for baseball. This marked history once again representing the first time that students have won the championship in each sport in one year. Because of the small number of students on the little island, six student athletes competed on all three championship winning teams: Timothy O'Neill, Mason Littlefield, Griffen Hall, Richard Conant, Ryan McGarry, and Jameson Brown-Padien. They are known as the "Silent Six".

References

External links

Schools in Washington County, Rhode Island